Amara Jones (born September 18, 1991) is a Bahamian sprinter from Freeport, Bahamas who competed in the 200m and 400. She attended Sunland Baptist Academy in Freeport, Bahamas, before competing for the Savannah State University. She was selected to the 2012 Olympic Games team for the Bahamas but did not compete. Jones also competed at 2013 World Championships in Athletics in Moscow, Russia.

Personal bests

References

External links
 World Athletics
 Savannah State Bio 

1991 births
Living people
Bahamian female sprinters
People from Freeport, Bahamas
Savannah State University alumni

World Athletics Championships athletes for the Bahamas